WWFY (100.9 FM, "Froggy 104.3 & 100.9") is a radio station licensed to serve Berlin, Vermont.  The station is owned by Great Eastern Radio.  It airs a country music format.

The station has been assigned these call letters by the Federal Communications Commission since May 21, 1999.

In the 1990s, the station, as WGTK, aired a classic rock format under the name "K101". They marketed themselves as "The Champlain Valley's classic rock station". In 1999, K101, while keeping the classic rock format, switched frequencies to 93.7, and 
became WRRO "The Arrow".

While WWFY has broadcast to the Barre-Montpelier area since October 2000, the 100.9 frequency was originally allocated over the mountains in Middlebury, where the station signed on as WCVM-FM on April 2, 1975. WCVM-FM was a sister to WFAD (1490 AM) in Middlebury, and operated as a class A facility at 3000 watts. At its sign-on, WCVM-FM carried an automated oldies format which lasted for several years.

The current air staff includes JD Green (morning drive), Randy Laprade (midday)  P.D. Jim Severance (afternoons) and The Lia Show (evenings).

WWFY, along with 29 other stations in northern New England formerly owned by Nassau Broadcasting Partners, was purchased at bankruptcy auction by Carlisle Capital Corporation, a company controlled by Bill Binnie (owner of WBIN-TV in Derry), on May 22, 2012. The station, and 12 of the other stations, were then acquired by Vertical Capital Partners, controlled by Jeff Shapiro. The deal was completed on November 30, 2012. The Vertical Capital Partners stations were transferred to Shapiro's existing Great Eastern Radio group on January 1, 2013.

References

External links

WFY
Country radio stations in the United States
Radio stations established in 2000
2000 establishments in Vermont